Gelt may refer to:

Gelt, also known as Hanukkah gelt, chocolate coins given to Jewish children on Hanukkah
River Gelt, a river of Cumbria, England
Gelt River (New Zealand), a river of Canterbury, New Zealand
Gelt Lake, a lake of Lombardy, Italy

People with the surname
Felix Gelt (born 1978), Canadian soccer player

See also
Geld (surname)